Ipstones railway station was a railway station that served the village of Ipstones, Staffordshire. It was opened by the North Staffordshire Railway (NSR) in 1905 and closed to passenger use in 1935, but remained open to freight traffic until 1964.

The station site today is used as a run-around loop for trains on the heritage Churnet Valley Railway with plans to reopen a station on the site.

Construction and opening
The single line branch was authorised on 1 March 1899 by the Leek, Caldon Low, and Hartington Light Railways Order, 1898, and construction took several years.

Station layout
The station had a single platform and limited goods facilities.

In NSR days the station staff comprised a station master, one porter and two porters/signallers.

Closure
The branch line was never a financial success and passenger services were withdrawn on 30 September 1935. The station remained open as a goods station until May 1964 when all traffic on the branch except mineral worksings from Caldon Low quarries was withdrawn.

The site today 
Mineral trains to Caldon Low continued until 1989 when the line was mothballed.  The station buildings had been demolished although the station house still stands.  In 2009 Moorland and City Railways purchased the line with the intention of reopening the line to mineral traffic from the quarry. In 2014 this plan was placed on hold as the Competition Commission ruled that Lafarge Tarmac must sell one of its sites, possibly Caldon Low, so the heritage railway the Churnet Valley Railway are seeking to purchase the line.

The Churnet Valley Railway ran the first services to Caldon Lowe in 2010 and reopened the loop at Ipstones in February 2014.

Route

Notes

References
 
 
 
 

Disused railway stations in Staffordshire
Railway stations in Great Britain opened in 1905
Railway stations in Great Britain closed in 1935
Former North Staffordshire Railway stations
Staffordshire Moorlands